The 1931 Tour of Flanders was held in 1931.

General classification

Final general classification

References
Résultats sur siteducyclisme.net
Résultats sur cyclebase.nl

External links
 

Tour of Flanders
1931 in Belgian sport
1931 in road cycling